Daniel Nestor and Nenad Zimonjić were the defending champions, but chose not to participate that year.

Simon Aspelin and Paul Hanley won in the final, 6–3, 6–3, against Marcelo Melo and Filip Polášek.

Seeds

Draw

Draw

External links
Draw

Doubles